Uckington is a village west of Cheltenham in Gloucestershire.

The population of the parish taken at the 2011 census was 605.

Not having a church, Uckington was formerly a hamlet in the parish of Elmstone-Hardwicke but is now a civil parish in its own right. The two villages share a village hall.

Uckington is in the borough of Tewkesbury, the Cheltenham post town, and on the Coombe Hill, Cheltenham, telephone exchange.

Nearby villages include Elmstone-Hardwicke and Boddington.

References

Villages in Gloucestershire
Borough of Tewkesbury